Sirsa is a city and a municipal council in Sirsa district in the westernmost region of the Indian state of Haryana, bordering Punjab and Rajasthan. It is located in Thar desert. It is located 250 kilometres north-west of New Delhi and 260 kilometres south-west of state capital Chandigarh. Sirsa Nearest city Hisar, Fatehabad, Bhadra, Nohar, Mandi Dabwali, Hanumangarh .Its history dates back to the time of the Mahabharata. At one time, the Sarasvati River flowed in this area.

History
Sirsa is listed in the Ain-i-Akbari as a pargana under the sarkar of Hisar, producing a revenue of 4,361,368 dams for the imperial treasury and supplying a force of 5000 infantry and 500 cavalry.

Geography
It has an average elevation of 205 metres (672 feet).

Demographics
As of 2011 Indian Census, Sirsa had a total population of 182,534, of which 96,175 were males and 86,359 were females. Population within the age group of 0 to 6 years was 20,825. The total number of literates in Sirsa was 131,570, which constituted 72.1% of the population with male literacy of 76.0% and female literacy of 67.7%. The effective literacy rate of 7+ population of Sirsa was 81.4%, of which male literacy rate was 86.2% and female literacy rate was 76.0%. The Scheduled Castes population was 39,208. Sirsa had 36191 households in 2011.

Religion

City

Point of interest

Air Force station
Sirsa has an air base of Indian Air Force named Sirsa Air Force Station and this is one of the most important Air Force Station of India near Pakistan border.

Dera Sacha Sauda
The non-governmental organization Dera Sacha Sauda, established in 1948 by ascetic Mastana Balochistani, has its headquarters in Sirsa.

Shri Tara Baba Kutiya (Tarakeswar Dham)
Shri Tara Baba Kutiya, also known as Tarakeswar Dham, was constructed in the year 2003 with help from Sirsa MLA Gopal Goyal Kanda. It is near Ramnagarian village on Rania Road. It has a statue of Shiva and an idol of Nandi.

References

External links
 Official website

Cities and towns in Sirsa district
Sirsa, Haryana